Richard Flury(Biberist, 26 March 1896 - 23 December 1967) was a Swiss conductor and composer.

Selected works
Eine florentinische Tragödie 1928
Die helle Nacht 1935 
Casanova e l’Albertolli 1938
Piano Concerto no.2, 1943
Der schlimm-heilige Vitalis (opera) 1962

References

Weblinks 
Sound recordings of works of the composer from the archives of Swiss Radio SRG SSR on Neo.Mx3

1896 births
1967 deaths